was a private junior college in Machida, Tokyo, Japan.

History 
In 1932, the school was founded as a dressmaker organization in Higashinada-ku, Kobe by Chiyo Tanaka. In 1972, it was chartered as a junior college with an academic department of clothing for women only in Machida, Tokyo. In 1973, the second academic department was set up: English studies for women only. In 1999, the junior college became coeducational. The college closed in 2010.

References

External links 
 Tokyo Tanaka College (personal website) 

Educational institutions established in 1972
Private universities and colleges in Japan
Japanese junior colleges
Universities and colleges in Tokyo